Bondarenko is a Ukrainian surname (from  - cooper), used by the following people:

Alona Bondarenko, Ukrainian tennis player, sister and tennis doubles partner of Kateryna Bondarenko
Andrei Bondarenko, Ukrainian opera singer
Andriy Bondarenko, Ukrainian composer and pianist
Artem Bondarenko, Ukrainian football player
Bohdan Bondarenko, Ukrainian high jumper
Dmitri Bondarenko, Russian anthropologist and historian
Ilya Bondarenko, Russian architect (1867–1947)
Joseph Bondarenko, author, theologian, public speaker
Kateryna Bondarenko, Ukrainian tennis player, sister and tennis doubles partner of Alona Bondarenko
Mikhail Bondarenko (disambiguation)
Nadezhda Bondarenko
Nikolai Bondarenko,  Russian opposition politician and blogger, Member of the Saratov Oblast Duma for the Communist Party
Oleksandr Bondarenko (disambiguation), several people
Olena Anatoliivna Bondarenko
Olena Fedorivna Bondarenko
Olga Bondarenko
Roman Bondarenko
Svitlana Bondarenko
Valentin Bondarenko, Soviet cosmonaut (1937–1961)
Valeria Bondarenko, Ukrainian former tennis player and elder sister of Alona and Kateryna
Valeri Bondarenko (born 1953), Estonian football player and manager
Valeriy Bondarenko (born 1994), Ukrainian footballer
Viktor Bondarenko (disambiguation) (several persons)

Bondarenko may also refer to
 Bondarenko, a lunar impact crater named after a Soviet cosmonaut Valentin Bondarenko

See also
 
 Bandarenka

Ukrainian-language surnames
Occupational surnames